Khodz is a rural locality (an aul) in Khodzinskoye Rural Settlement of Koshekhablsky District, Adygea, Russia. The population was 2772 as of 2018. There are 50 streets.

Geography 
The aul is located on the left bank of the Khodz River, 51 km south of Koshekhabl (the district's administrative centre) by road. Karmolino-Gidroitsky is the nearest rural locality.

Ethnicity 
The aul is inhabited by Adyghes.

References 

Rural localities in Koshekhablsky District